Wilhelm Levison (27 May 1876, in Düsseldorf – 17 January 1947, in Durham) was a German medievalist.

He was well known as a contributor to Monumenta Germaniae Historica, especially for the vitae from the Merovingian era. He also edited Wilhelm Wattenbach's Deutschlands Geschichtsquellen im Mittelalter. In 1935 he was forced to retire from his professorship at Bonn University because of the Nuremberg Laws. He fled Nazi Germany in the spring of 1939, taking a position at Durham University. He delivered the Ford Lectures at the University of Oxford in 1943, and they were published as England and the Continent in the Eighth Century. He died during the preparation of Aus Rheinischer und Fränkischer Frühzeit (1948).

Reputation and influence
Conrad Leyser described Levison as "one of the giants of twentieth-century historical scholarship, his England and the Continent in the Eighth century one of its canonical texts"; Nicholas Howe, in 2004, called that book of "enduring" importance. Five conferences have been held in commemoration of his work, and the lectures given at the 2007 meeting at Durham University were published in 2010. Theodor Schieffer dedicated his Winfried - Bonifatius und die christliche Grundlegung Europas to Levison, who had been his doctoral advisor.

References

External links
 The Levison papers at Durham University

1876 births
1947 deaths
Writers from Düsseldorf
German medievalists
Academic staff of the University of Bonn
Jewish emigrants from Nazi Germany to the United Kingdom
Academics of Durham University
German male non-fiction writers